Daryl Peter "Moose" Johnston (born February 10, 1966) is an American former professional football player who was a fullback in the National Football League (NFL) for the Dallas Cowboys. He played college football at Syracuse University. He was the General Manager of the San Antonio Commanders of the Alliance of American Football in 2019, the Director of Player Personnel for the Dallas Renegades in 2020, and currently serves as the Executive Vice President of Football Operations for the newest incarnation of the USFL.

Early years
Johnston was named Western New York Player of the Year in 1983, while playing for Lewiston-Porter High School (locally known as Lew-Port) in Lewiston, New York. The Lancers won the division during his senior year in 1984.

His Lew-Port jersey (number 34) was retired on September 1, 2006. In 2008, he was inducted into the Greater Buffalo Sports Hall of Fame.

College career
Johnston attended Syracuse University. As a redshirted freshman, he started playing on special teams and would earn the starting fullback position by his sophomore season in 1986.

While playing for Syracuse, Johnston was an All-Big East selection in 1987 and an All-American in 1988. He rushed for 1,830 yards and caught 46 passes during his collegiate career. He once gained 138 yards rushing, the most by a Syracuse running back since Larry Csonka rushed for 154 yards in 1967.

He graduated with a degree in economics.

Professional career

Johnston was selected by the Dallas Cowboys in the second round (39th overall) of the 1989 NFL Draft. As a rookie, he received his nickname "Moose" from backup quarterback Babe Laufenberg because of his large stature compared to the rest of the running backs. The name caught on among Dallas fans who would chant "Moooooose" whenever he made a play.

As a Cowboy, Johnston played in 149 consecutive games from 1989-1997. He also became one of the greatest special teams players in franchise history.

He scored 22 career touchdowns and had more receptions than carries. His 294 receptions is the third-highest number among Cowboys running backs, totaling 2,227 yards for a 7.6 yards average, compared to 232 carries for 753 yards for a 3.2 yards average. In 1993 Johnston had 50 receptions and averaged 7.4 yards per catch.

Due mainly to Johnston's contributions, the NFL created the fullback position in the Pro Bowl. Prior to this change, blocking fullbacks had little chance of beating out traditional running backs, who had better statistics. Johnston was selected to the Pro Bowl in 1993 and in 1994.

Johnston retired at the end of the 1999 season, after suffering a neck injury in 1997. He was a member of three Super Bowl winning teams.

NFL career statistics
Rushing Stats

Receiving Stats

Legacy
Johnston was considered one of the best fullbacks of his day, while blocking for Emmitt Smith, as Smith went on to become the all-time NFL rushing leader.  However, Johnston was not the lead blocker for Smith's entire career. A neck injury prematurely ended Johnston's career.  Johnston was present the day Smith broke the rushing record; he was in the broadcasting booth, but came down onto the field to hug Smith and congratulate him afterward.  As Smith made his victory lap of Texas Stadium after the record-setting carry, Johnston hung back in the shadows.  When Smith saw Johnston, the two joined together in an emotional embrace, with Smith telling Johnston, "I couldn't have done it without you".  Johnston replied, "It was my pleasure. I couldn't imagine doing it for anybody else".

In 2010, Johnston was in the audience for Emmitt Smith's induction into the Pro Football Hall of Fame. During his acceptance speech, a visibly emotional Smith spoke directly to Johnston, calling out the fact that, as a fullback, he had sacrificed himself for so many years to block for Smith. "Without you", Smith said, "I know that today would not have been possible."

Broadcasting career
In 2003, Johnston joined the program Players Inc Radio when it moved to Fox Sports Radio. The program was sponsored by NFL Players Inc. Since 2013, Johnston has worked as a color commentator alongside Kenny Albert and formerly Dick Stockton.  Previously, Johnston was on the second broadcast team with Stockton from 2001–06 and Albert from 2007-13. He also worked with Tony "Goose" Siragusa, until Siragusa's firing from the network following the 2015 season. In 2000, Johnston got his start calling NFL games by working the regular season and doing the High Definition broadcast of Super Bowl XXXV with Kevin Harlan for CBS Sports. He was an analyst for the NFL Network's "Total Access" until 2012. Johnston also began calling the collegiate Cotton Bowl Classic game for Fox in 2009, first with Pat Summerall, and then eventually Kenny Albert. He also was a guest star of the PBS television series Wishbone in its episode "Moonbone". He appears as a regular guest on First Things First on FS1 (2017/2018) with Cris Carter, Nick Wright and Jenna Wolfe. In 2017, he continued his esteemed broadcasting career with NFL on FOX, teamed with Chris Myers and Laura Okmin. In 2020, he became paired with Kevin Burkhardt and Pam Oliver. He is currently paired with Joe Davis and Pam Oliver as the number 2 crew with FOX.

Executive career
In 2018, Johnston became the General Manager of the San Antonio Commanders of the Alliance of American Football.

On May 15, 2019, he was named Director of Player Personnel for the Dallas Renegades of the new XFL.

He currently serves as the Executive Vice President of Football Operations for the newest incarnation of the USFL.

Personal life
A native of Youngstown, New York, Johnston now resides in Dallas, Texas with his wife Diane, son Aidan, and daughter Evan.

References and notes

External links
 Dallas Cowboys Top 50 players
 

1966 births
Living people
American football fullbacks
College football announcers
Dallas Cowboys players
National Conference Pro Bowl players
National Football League announcers
People from Youngstown, New York
Players of American football from New York (state)
Syracuse Orange football players
NFL Europe broadcasters
Ed Block Courage Award recipients